Experimental Parasitology is a monthly peer-reviewed scientific journal covering the field of parasitology. It is published by Elsevier and was established in 1951. The main topics covered are the physiology, immunology, biochemistry, and molecular biology of eukaryotic parasites, and the interaction between the parasite and its host, including chemotherapy against parasites.  The editors-in-chief are Anton Aebischer (Robert Koch Institute, Berlin, Germany) and Bernd Kalinna (University of Melbourne, Australia).

Abstracting and indexing
The journal is abstracted and indexed by:

According to the Journal Citation Reports, the journal has a 2013 impact factor of 1.859, ranking it 17th out of 36 journals in the category "Parasitology".

References

External links

Elsevier academic journals
Publications established in 1951
Parasitology journals
English-language journals
Monthly journals
Hybrid open access journals